Legislative elections were held in Mexico on 2 July 1961. The Institutional Revolutionary Party won 172 of the 178 seats in the Chamber of Deputies.

Results

References

Mexico
Legislative
Legislative elections in Mexico
Legislative
Election and referendum articles with incomplete results